Idera, Inc. is the parent company of a portfolio of brands that offer B2B software including database tools, application development tools, test management tools, and DevOps tools. It is headquartered in Houston, Texas and has offices in Australia, Austria, and the United Kingdom. It is owned by the private equity firms HGGC, Partners Group and TA Associates.

History 
Idera was founded in 2000 by Tien Gah "Alan" Lee to create developer tools beginning with the original JSync product.  Alan was head of development and secretary of the company.  The company was led by President John Mercadante and CFO Matt Jordan.  In October 2003 Idera was sold to PointSecure, Inc owned by Rick Pleczko.  

Rick Pleczko founded BBS Technologies in 2000. The company produced a line of server backup software products later under the name Idera, competing for business with Imceda and later Red Gate Software.

BBS acquired web hosting backup provider R1Soft in late November 2007. It existed as a separate division until 2012, when its continuous data protection product was rolled into the Idera product line as Idera Server Backup 5.0. This restructuring was accompanied by a new "pay-as-you-go" pricing model.

The company formally changed its name to Idera, Inc. in January 2012.

Idera was acquired by TA Associates in September 2014.

On May 31, 2017, HGGC bought a controlling stake.  

On May 23, 2019, Partners Group made an investment in Idera.

Subsidiaries 
 Precise Software: On July 2, 2013, Idera, Inc. announced the acquisition of Precise Software as a wholly owned subsidiary, a provider of end-to-end application performance management software.
 Uptime Software, a server infrastructure monitoring tool company, was acquired in November 2014.
 Embarcadero Technologies, Inc.: On October 7, 2015, Idera, Inc. announced an agreement to acquire Embarcadero Technologies, Inc., but the Embarcadero mark was retained for the developer tools division. As of October 28, 2015, Embarcadero was listed as 'acquired'.
 Gurock, a provider of test case management software, was acquired in June 2016.
 AquaFold, a database tools company, was acquired in July 2017.
 Sencha, Inc., developers of a pure JavaScript application development framework for desktop and mobile browsers, was acquired in August 2017.
 Ranorex, a test-automation software company, was acquired in October 2017.
 Webyog, a database management tool provider, was acquired in April 2018.
 Froala, editing for rich text and web application tools, was acquired in June 2018.
 Whole Tomato, a suite of visual studio productivity tools, was acquired in August 2018.
 Kiuwan, a SaaS for measuring and analyzing security risks in software development, was acquired in October 2018.
 Assembla, a source code management provider, was acquired in November 2018.
 LANSA, a low-code application development tool, was acquired in December 2018.
 Travis CI, an open-source continuous integration company, was acquired in January 2019.
 WhereScape, a provider of data warehouse automation software, was acquired in September 2019.
 FusionCharts, a data visualization product provider, was acquired in March 2020.
 Qubole, a multi-platform data lake company, was acquired in October 2020.
 apilayer, a provider of real-time data API products, was acquired in January 2021.
 PreEmptive, the maker of Dotfuscator and DashO, code obfuscators for .net and Java, respectively, was acquired in March 2021.
 IDM Computer Solutions, the maker of UltraEdit and other applications, was acquired in August of 2021.

Former subsidiaries 
 Idera sold its SharePoint business to Metalogix in October 2013.

Products 
Idera creates tools designed to support, supplement, and augment the capabilities of Microsoft SQL Server, including SQL Diagnostic Manager, SQL Doctor, and SQL Inventory Manager. The company also offers a software as a service server backup product known as SQL Safe Backup, which allows hosting providers and others to offer their clients continuous data protection for their backups. They also offer a number of free tools for SQL Server performance, backup, and diagnostics and for Windows PowerShell.

Recognition 
Idera's software has a number of awards within the SQL Server and IT communities. SQL Toolbox has won several Best of TechEd Awards and some of their SQL Server offerings have placed in the SQL Server Pro Community Choice Awards. The free tool, PowerShell Plus, has won Windows IT Pro Editors' Best and Community Choice awards.

References 

2000 establishments in Texas
Companies based in Houston
Software companies based in Texas
Software companies established in 2000
Software companies of the United States